Same-sex marriage is not currently performed in American Samoa, though same-sex marriages from other jurisdictions are recognized. On June 26, 2015, the U.S. Supreme Court ruled in Obergefell v. Hodges that the Fourteenth Amendment of the U.S. Constitution guarantees same-sex couples the right to marry. The ruling legalized same-sex marriage nationwide in the United States; however, it is uncertain how the ruling applies to American Samoa as the territory is unincorporated and unorganized. The Governor of American Samoa, Lolo Matalasi Moliga, said he believed that the Supreme Court's ruling does not apply to American Samoa. 

In 2022, the United States Congress passed the Respect for Marriage Act requiring all U.S. states and territories to recognize same-sex marriages performed in other jurisdictions.

Background
The American Samoa Code does not specify the sex of the parties to a marriage, but refers to the age of "the male" and "the female". It prescribes the use of a form in which the parties identify the parents to whom they are related as "son" and as "daughter".

In 2003, Representative Sua Carl Schuster introduced legislation to the American Samoa Fono to ban same-sex marriage. The measure was proposed a few years after the federal Defense of Marriage Act (DOMA) by passed by the United States Congress and signed into law by President Bill Clinton. Schuster said he hoped to establish the territory's position clearly in order to avoid lawsuits like those in the mainland United States. Many supporters of the bill cited their Christian faith as their reason for supporting his proposal. The House Judiciary Committee voted against it and then the full Senate did as well. 

Samoan culture recognizes people who occupy a third gender role in society. They are known as faʻafafine and are considered an integral part of Samoan society. The faʻafafine are raised as girls from early childhood, wear women's clothing, and carry out women's work in the home and the community. Faʻafafine have sexual relationships exclusively with men who do not identify as faʻafafine, but if they wish to marry and have children they will marry women. The faʻafafine status thus creates the possibility for marriages between two female-presenting individuals to be performed in Samoan culture.

Obergefell v. Hodges

It is uncertain how the U.S. Supreme Court's ruling in Obergefell v. Hodges applies to American Samoa as the territory is unorganized and unincorporated and its citizens are U.S. nationals by birth and not citizens. In July 2015, Attorney General Eleasalo Ale said that his office was "reviewing the decision to determine its applicability to American Samoa". A week later, the Governor of American Samoa, Lolo Matalasi Moliga, said he believed that the Supreme Court's ruling does not apply to American Samoa. He said, "My personal opinion is, this ruling will not apply to our preamble, our constitution and our Christian values. Also, our political status is still unorganized and unincorporated, so the Supreme Court ruling does not apply to our territory." His stance was backed by the Assemblies of God, the Catholic Church, and the Church of Jesus Christ of Latter-day Saints. Senator Tuaolo Manaia Fruean believes that the ruling does apply.

Howard Hills, writing for the Samoa News, noted that "The U.S. Supreme Court long has held the U.S. Constitution does not apply by its own force in 'unincorporated' territories like American Samoa. This leaves exactly which 'fundamental rights' are applicable in not yet incorporated territories undefined, until determined by Congress and the courts on a case-by-case basis." Professor Rose Cuison Villazor at the University of California, Davis School of Law said that the court ruling "should not be questioned" in American Samoa, and that "the Supreme Court's decision was pretty strong. ... I would think there are cultural barriers to begin with. The AG might present some other legal and social barriers, too." Omar Gonzales-Pagan of Lambda Legal argued that the territories are required to comply due to the supremacy of federal law, and that same-sex marriage "... is a question of individual right, individual liberty." Chimene Keitner, an expert on territorial issues at the University of California, Hastings College of the Law, said that for same-sex marriage to be recognized in American Samoa, there needs to be a voluntary decision or litigation. Litigation would require "plaintiffs who have been denied the right to marry and are willing to take a public position on that and challenge their inability to marry. Plaintiffs could also be those who were married elsewhere and want the marriage recognized in American Samoa." Lambda Legal has asked any American Samoan same-sex couple, who has been denied a marriage license, to contact them or the American Civil Liberties Union, the GLBTQ Legal Advocates & Defenders, or the National Center for Lesbian Rights immediately for assistance.

In January 2016, former Attorney General Fiti Alexander Sunia was appointed as the new district court judge. His appointment was confirmed unanimously by the American Samoa Senate. During his confirmation hearing, Sunia was asked about Obergefell. He responded that he had not read the decision, and that same-sex marriage fell outside the jurisdiction of the district court. He also said that he would not perform weddings for same-sex couples in his new assignment unless the local marriage statutes were changed.

Respect for Marriage Act
Under the Respect for Marriage Act passed by the United States Congress in December 2022 and signed into law by President Joe Biden on December 13, 2022, all territories, including American Samoa, are required to recognize, though not perform, same-sex marriages performed legally in another jurisdiction. The law requires same-sex and opposite-sex couples to be treated equally.

See also
LGBT rights in American Samoa
Recognition of same-sex unions in Oceania
Same-sex marriage in the United States

References 

American Samoa
LGBT in American Samoa
American Samoa